Outside World is a 2002 compilation album by Propaganda. The album collects remixes, B-sides and extra tracks released on 7-inch and 12-inch records, cassette singles and white-label DJ vinyl pressings during the band's tenure on the ZTT label in 1984/85. It was released as a CD and as a CD with a bonus DVD containing promotional videos and TV commercials.

Track listing CD
 "Das Testament des Dr. Mabuse (13th Life Mix)" – 6:34
 "Lied" – 2:48
 "p:Machinery (Beta Mix)" – 9:33
 "Duel (Bitter Sweet)" – 7:38
 "The Lesson" – 4:18
 "Frozen Faces (12" Version)" – 5:30
 "Jewel" – 6:54
 "Complete Machinery" – 10:56
 "Das Testament des Dr. Mabuse (DJ Promo Version)" – 9:52
 "Femme Fatale (The Woman with the Orchid)" – 3:34
 "Echo of Frozen Faces" – 10:28

Track 9 was originally only previously available as a promotional white-label 12-inch vinyl recording, having never been commercially released prior to its inclusion on this compilation.

The German version of the CD replaces "Complete Machinery" with "p:Machinery Connected", taken directly from a copy of the cassette single. As a result, the sound quality is diminished. Reference to this issue is made in the album's liner notes.

Track listing bonus DVD
 "Dr. Mabuse" (Version 1)
 "Dr. Mabuse" (Version 2)
Promotional videos directed by Anton Corbijn. Version 1 is a spectacular black-and-white affair featuring Claudia Brucken being stalked by Mabuse (actor Vladek Sheybal), through a dark and eerie castle full of monks. The second is studio-set, and unlike the previous video features fifth member Michael Mertens and the band's rarely-seen drummer Weet. Highlights include Andreas Thein smashing up a bathtub with hammers.
 "Duel" (Version 1)
 "Duel" (Version 2)
Promotional videos directed by John "Scarlet" Davis and Paul Morley. Identical, except that Version 1 features on-screen graphics. 
 "p:Machinery"
Promotional video directed by Zbigniew Rybczyński. Filmed in a Manhattan warehouse, with Claudia performing in front of Ralf, Susanne and Michael, who are strung up on harnesses like puppets, being operated from a gantry above.
 "Dr Mabuse" (TV commercial)
 "Duel" (TV commercial)

References

External links
 [ Allmusic Guide]

2002 compilation albums
Propaganda (band) albums
Albums produced by Trevor Horn
Albums produced by Stephen Lipson
2002 video albums
ZTT Records compilation albums
ZTT Records video albums